Blame! (stylized as BLAME!) is a 2017 Japanese CGI anime science fiction action film directed by Hiroyuki Seshita, produced by Polygon Pictures, written by Sadayuki Murai and based on the manga series Blame!, which was written and illustrated by Tsutomu Nihei. It was released globally by Netflix on May 20, 2017.

Plot

In the distant technological future, civilization has reached its ultimate Net-based form. An "infection" in the past caused the automated systems to spiral out of control, resulting in a multi-leveled city structure that replicates itself infinitely in all directions. Now humanity has lost access to the city's controls and is hunted down to be purged as "illegal" by the defense system known as the Safeguard. In a village, a group known as the Electro-Fishers is facing eventual extinction, trapped between the threat of the Safeguard and dwindling food supplies. A girl named Zuru goes on a journey to find food for her village with a group of friends, only to inadvertently cause doom when a Watchtower senses her and spawns a Safeguard pack to eliminate them. With her companions dead and all escape routes blocked, the sudden arrival of Killy the Wanderer, on his quest to find a human who possesses the Net Terminal Gene, saves her along with Tae, her close friend.

Killy is brought back to the village, where he meets Pop, leader of the village, who expresses interest in him after they hear that he has been from '6000 levels below'. Killy even helps to assist with the village's food problem by passing them a large amount of rations. Abruptly, he leaves for an area below the village named the Rotting Shrine, and followed by Zuru and Tae, he finds the spoilt machine-corpse of Cibo, a former scientist from before the disaster. Cibo reveals that it is she that built a shield generator that protects the village from the Safeguard, and tells the villagers that it is possible to produce more of the rations by going to a nearby 'automated factory'.

Heeding her words, a group of Electro-Fishers including Tae and Zuru travel to the automated factory in search of more rations. Arriving there, Cibo assists in logging into the system and produces a large amount of rations, much to the delight of the Electro-Fishers. However, right after she produces a machine for Killy, the system rejects her log-in and starts to mass-produce Exterminators to eliminate the Electro-Fishers. Cibo, who remakes herself using the system in a cyborg form, leads the villagers, with Tae now having broken her arm, to a railway car and escapes back to the village. During the ride, Killy is knocked unconscious trying to save the Electro-Fishers.

Arriving at the village, the villagers celebrate the sudden amount of food while also mourning their loss. While holding the celebration, Cibo secretly wakes Killy up with only Zuru as a witness and leads him down towards the shield generator with the machine. While heading down, Tae takes her gun to the observatory platform and shoots the shield generator, whereupon it is revealed that the real Tae was killed and replaced by a cyborg representative for the Safeguard back at the factory. Sanakan, as she now calls herself, proceeds to kill most of the villagers, deeming them illegal residents while destroying the village in the process.

Killy, realizing what has occurred, runs back up to the village on his own. Cibo travels further down at a faster pace, where she sets the machine right next to the destroyed Shield Generator and connects herself to it. Back at the top, Sanakan is killing villagers, but the village elders frantically lead the rest of the villagers to the top of the village where they resist her using their remaining weapons. Killy himself enters combat with Sanakan, who after knocking him down, notes that he is a body 'stolen from the Safeguard'. Killy is saved at the last minute by Zuru, who throws his gun to him; which he shoots and destroys Sanakan, but not before Sanakan destroys Cibo.

Cibo, in an alternate dimension, pleads with the Authority, which controls the Safeguard, to let the villagers go. Unable to do so, they allow her to access the City's map, revealing an abandoned level safe from Safeguard control where the villagers can evacuate to.

Cibo, now functioning through her only remaining arm, leads the remaining villagers to a trans-level railway car, but right after the villagers get in, a Watchtower spots them and spawns a gigantic Exterminator. Killy throws the device which has been keeping him safe from the Safeguard to Zuru, upon which he says that he still wants to find the Net Terminal Gene, which enables human control of the city and all machines, including the Safeguard. Killy seemingly sacrifices himself so that the villagers could escape. 

Later it is revealed that Zuru and other villagers successfully reached the abandoned level and established a new village there. Her granddaughter reminisces of the times when her grandmother Zuru used to tell about Killy, and it seems that the device Killy gave them is still in her possession. As she thinks how she believes that Killy should still be alive somewhere it is shown that he continues his journey even to this day, wandering in search of the Net Terminal Gene.

Cast

Production
Plans for a full-length CG animated film were announced in 2007. However, this proposed CG film project was not released before Micott and Basara (the studio hired) filed for bankruptcy in 2011.

It was announced in November 2015 that the series would get an anime theatrical film adaptation. The film was directed by Hiroyuki Seshita and written by Tsutomu Nihei and Sadayuki Murai, with animation by Polygon Pictures and character designs by Yuki Moriyama. It was released globally as a Netflix original on the 20th of May 2017.

Release
Blame! was released by Polygon Pictures on May 19, 2017. It was made available to subscribers on Netflix on May 20, 2017.

On October 5, 2017, Viz Media announced at their New York Comic Con panel that they had licensed the home video rights to Blame! They released the film on Blu-ray Disc and DVD on March 27, 2018.

Reception

Critical response
Michael Nordine of IndieWire rated it B− and wrote that its worth a watch, but the "world-building is more engaging than its plotting".  Toussaint Egan of Paste praised the adaptation for being both faithful and opening it to wider appeal, concluding that it is "one of the most conceptually entertaining anime films of late".  James Brusuelas of Animation World Network wrote that although the plot is familiar, it is "definitely worth your time".

Accolades
Blame! won VFX-Japan Awards' 2018 "Excellence" and "Best" awards in the "Animated Theatrical Film" category. It was part of the Jury Selections of the 21st Japan Media Arts Festival in the Animation category.

References

External links
 

2017 science fiction action films
2017 anime films
2017 computer-animated films
Action anime and manga
Animated action films
Anime films based on manga
Film
Films about terrorism
Films set in the future
Netflix original anime
Japanese animated science fiction films
Japanese science fiction action films
Japanese-language Netflix original films
Viz Media anime
Cyberpunk anime and manga
Cyberpunk films
Japanese computer-animated films
Polygon Pictures